Jannis Nikolaou (born 31 July 1993) is a German professional footballer who plays as a defender for Eintracht Braunschweig.

References

External links
 

Living people
1993 births
Sportspeople from Bonn
German footballers
German people of Greek descent
Greek footballers
Association football defenders
1. FC Köln II players
FC Rot-Weiß Erfurt players
Würzburger Kickers players
Dynamo Dresden players
Eintracht Braunschweig players
3. Liga players
2. Bundesliga players
Footballers from North Rhine-Westphalia